2-Methylpyridine, or 2-picoline, is the compound described with formula C6H7N. 2-Picoline is a colorless liquid that has an unpleasant odor similar to pyridine. It is mainly used to make vinylpyridine and the agrichemical nitrapyrin.

Synthesis
2-Picoline was the first pyridine compound reported to be isolated in pure form. It was isolated from coal tar in 1846 by T. Anderson. This chemistry was practiced by Reilly Industries.  It is now mainly produced by two principal routes.  One method involves the condensation of acetaldehyde and ammonia in the presence of an oxide catalyst.  This method affords a mixture of 2- and 4-picolines:

Another method involves the condensation of acetone and acrylonitrile to give 5-oxohexanenitrile, which then cyclizes to give 2-picoline. 
Approximately 8000 t/a was produced worldwide in 1989.

Reactions
Most of the reactions of picoline are centered on the methyl group. For example, the principal use of 2-picoline is as a precursor of 2-vinylpyridine. The conversion is achieved by condensation with formaldehyde:

The copolymer of 2-vinylpyridine, butadiene and styrene is used as an adhesive for textile tire cord.  2-Picoline is also a precursor to the agrichemical, nitrapyrin, which prevents loss of ammonia from fertilizers.  Oxidation by potassium permanganate affords picolinic acid:

Treatment of 2-methylpyridine with butyllithium results in deprotonation of the methyl group:
H3CC5H4N  +  BuLi  →  LiH2CC5H4N  +  BuH

Biodegradation
Like other pyridine derivatives, 2-methylpyridine is often reported as an environmental contaminant associated with facilities processing oil shale or coal, and has also been found at legacy wood treatment sites.  The compound is readily degradable by certain microorganisms, such as Arthrobacter sp. strain R1 (ATTC strain number 49987), which was isolated from an aquifer contaminated with a complex mixture of pyridine derivatives. Arthrobacter and closely related Actinomycetota are often found associated with degradation of pyridine derivatives and other nitrogen heterocyclic compounds. 2-methypyridine and 4-methypyridine are more readily degraded and exhibit less volatilization loss from environmental samples than does 3-methypyridine.

Uses
2-Methylpyridine is an intermediate used in the production of some pharmaceutical drugs including amprolium, picoplatin, dimethindene, and encainide.

Toxicity
Like most alkylpyridines, the LD50 of 2-methylpyridine is modest, being 790 mg/kg (oral, rat).

References

2-Pyridyl compounds
Foul-smelling chemicals